Portugal competed at the 2022 Winter Olympics in Beijing, China, from 4 to 20 February 2022.

The Portuguese team consisted of three athletes (two men and one woman) competing in two sports. Ricardo Brancal and Vanina Guerillot were the country's flagbearer during the opening ceremony. Meanwhile a volunteer was the flagbearer during the closing ceremony.

Competitors
The following is the list of number of competitors participating at the Games per sport/discipline.

Alpine skiing

By meeting the basic qualification standards Portugal qualified one male and one female alpine skier.

Cross-country skiing

By meeting the basic qualification standards Portugal qualified one male cross-country skier.

Distance

References

Nations at the 2022 Winter Olympics
2022
Winter Olympics